Peter Ernest Tiboris is an American producer particularly noted for conducting and producing concerts at Carnegie Hall, Lincoln Center, and other classical music venues around the world, especially in Greece. He has conducted over 50 concerts in Stern Auditorium / Perelman Stage at Carnegie Hall and at Lincoln Center and produced nearly 1300 concerts worldwide through the company he founded in 1983, MidAmerica Productions. Mr. Tiboris' concerts have been hailed by The New York Times as "sizzling and precise," and "vigorous...alert and energetic."

Early life and education

Peter Tiboris was born in Sheboygan, Wisconsin, on October 31, 1947, to Ernest Peter Tiboris, a dentist, from Sheboygan, Wisconsin, and Stella Menas, of Waukegan, Illinois, first generation Greek-Americans of the Greek Orthodox faith.

Peter Tiboris’ interests in Greek culture and music began at age five with piano lessons and continued at age nine with organ lessons given by the Reverend Father Peter Murtos of the St. Spyridon Greek Orthodox Church in Sheboygan. At age 10 he became St. Spyridon's organist.

Peter Tiboris studied music education at the University of Wisconsin–Madison, receiving a bachelor's degree (B.M.) in 1970 and a master's degree (M.S.) in 1974. While still an undergraduate, he became Assistant Choir Master at the Assumption Greek Orthodox Church of Madison, under Michael Petrovich.

In 1980, he received a doctorate (Ed.D) in music education from the University of Illinois at Urbana–Champaign. Between 1972 and 1984, he taught at colleges in Wisconsin, Illinois, New Hampshire, and Louisiana.

MidAmerica Productions

While serving as Associate Professor of Music at the University of Southwestern Louisiana in Lafayette (now called University of Louisiana at Lafayette) in 1983, Peter Tiboris was asked to organize a concert in New York to commemorate the 25th anniversary of Archbishop Iakovos as Primate of the Greek Orthodox Church of North and South America. The concert, on January 7, 1984, at Alice Tully Hall, Lincoln Center, brought together soloists, choruses from Louisiana and New York, and the American Symphony Orchestra for a Greek-themed program which included the world premiere of Dinos Constantinides’ Hymn to the Human Spirit and the New York premiere of Constantinides’ Lament of Antigone. The concert also marked the New York conducting debut of Peter Tiboris and the inaugural concert of MidAmerica Productions.

A review of Peter Tiboris’ first concert, written by the critic Tim Page in The New York Times, deemed Mr. Tiboris’ New York conducting debut “vigorous…alert, energetic.”

Peter Tiboris has conducted many works in the choral repertoire as well as symphonic works, operas, and ballets, including world, U.S., and New York premieres of works by Beethoven/Mahler, Bruckner, Dinos Constantinides, Dello Joio, Dohnányi, Effinger, Philip Glass, Gregory Magarshak, Mozart, Nielsen, Schnittke, Taneyev, Tchaikovsky, and Mikis Theodorakis.; as well as rarely performed works by Cherubini and Rossini. He has also conducted in more than 20 countries, including Albania, Austria, Bulgaria, Canada, Czech Republic, Egypt, France, Germany, Greece, Israel, Italy, Mexico, Poland, Portugal, Romania, Russia, Serbia, Spain, Switzerland, Turkey, Ukraine, and the United Kingdom. In March 2016, he made his Asian conducting debut with the Macau Symphony Orchestra in China.

MidAmerica Productions has presented nearly 1300 concerts worldwide, including 1011 concerts in New York, in such venues as Stern Auditorium, and Weill Recital Hall at Carnegie Hall; and Avery Fisher Hall and Alice Tully Hall, Lincoln Center. The original choral format has expanded to include Madrigal Festivals, a National Wind Ensemble, Vocal Jazz Festivals, National Festival Youth Orchestra, Sweet Adelines, and solo concerts featuring such musicians as Alan Gilbert and Stanley Drucker. Since 1988, English composer and conductor John Rutter has made over 100 appearances with MidAmerica, including at the world premiere of his Mass of the Children in February 2003.

The company has become a launching pad for Elysium Recordings, Inc.,  a CD label founded in 1995 that has released 27 recordings to date and is distributed by ArkivMusic which includes significant works by Mascagni and performances by Lukas Foss; the Manhattan Philharmonic, a freelance orchestra in New York; a solo and chamber music series at Weill Recital Hall and Alice Tully Hall; and a music festival in Greece, Festival of the Aegean, which completed its 11th season in 2015 on the Island of Syros and was named “Best Festival in Greater Greece 2011” by the Music Critics of the Union of Greek Music and Theater Critics, Athens, Greece. In 2013 Peter Tiboris founded MidAm International, Inc., a producer of concerts in Europe and Asia. Since then, in addition to the annual Festival of the Aegean, MidAm International, Inc. has presented concerts in Vienna, Austria; and Florence, Italy with proposed concerts through 2017 in Vienna, Austria; Florence, Italy; Syros, Greece; and Hangzhou, Shanghai, and Beijing, China.

Personal life

Peter Tiboris is married to the soprano Eilana Lappalainen and has two children from a previous marriage, Ernest Peter Tiboris, born in 1979; and Stephanie Susan Tiboris, born in 1982. His brother, Gus, a dentist, was born in 1948 in Sheboygan, Wisconsin.

Discography

References

External links
 Official Website
 MidAmerica Productions Website
 Festival of the Aegean Website
 St. Spyridon Church, Sheboygan, WI

1947 births
Living people
20th-century American conductors (music)
21st-century American conductors (music)
American male conductors (music)
20th-century American male musicians
21st-century American male musicians